Welcome to Blood City is a 1977 science fiction Western film directed by Peter Sasdy and starring Jack Palance, Keir Dullea and Samantha Eggar.

Plot
Five strangers awake finding themselves with no memory in a world resembling the wild west. Their task is to become exempt from being killed – what the townspeople refer to as being "immortal" –  by killing twenty of the other inhabitants of the town under the scrutiny of the sheriff (Jack Palance), otherwise they will spend their lives in slavery.

Cast
Jack Palance as Frendlander
Keir Dullea as Lewis
Samantha Eggar as Katherine
Barry Morse as Supervisor
Hollis McLaren as Martine
Chris Wiggins as Gellor

Production
Shot in Cinespace Film Studios in Kleinburg, a village north of Toronto, Welcome to Blood City was an early Canada/U.K. co-production.

References

External links
 

1977 films
1970s Western (genre) science fiction films
British Western (genre) science fiction films
Canadian Western (genre) science fiction films
EMI Films films
English-language Canadian films
Films about death games
Films about virtual reality
Films directed by Peter Sasdy
Films scored by Roy Budd
1970s English-language films
1970s Canadian films
1970s British films